Gary Leslie Hooper, MBE (born 11 February 1939) is an Australian Paralympic competitor.  He won seven medals at three Paralympics from 1960 to 1968.

Personal
Hooper was born on 11 February 1939 in Sydney. He never knew his biological father, and lived with his stepfather.  He grew up near Newcastle in Toronto. 

He contracted polio at the age of eleven, and lost the use of both his legs. At 16, he attended a live-in rehabilitation centre at the former naval base in Jervis Bay, where he learned a range of trade crafts, including metalwork, woodwork and leatherwork. All students at the centre were encouraged to become as physically fit as possible. After the centre was moved to the Mount Wilga Rehabilitation Hospital in Hornsby, Hooper became involved in wheelchair sport competitions and was successful from the outset.

Hooper  trained to become a bookbinder and worked for 25 years at the Newcastle Public Library. He volunteered as the welfare officer for the Foundation for the Disabled in Newcastle. He retired from the Newcastle Public Library in April 1983, 25 years to the day after he commenced, due to ill health following several motor vehicle accidents. Later, he also worked as a public speaker and accessibility consultant. 

During Hooper's sporting career, athletes contributed significantly to the cost of attending international sporting events. The contribution was often more than could be afforded by individuals and Hooper was the beneficiary of fundraising efforts by his local community. In 1970, the Hamilton Apex Club launched an appeal which raised $1,490 to send Hooper to the Commonwealth Paraplegic Games in Edinburgh after efforts by the Swansea-Belmont Surf Club and the Toronto Leagues Club fell short of the required amount and Hooper was about to withdraw from the team.

In 1964 he married Janice, who was a librarian at the Newcastle Public Library. They have two sons.

Career
Throughout his career, Hooper was a prodigious winner of titles at all levels and across a range of sports. At the 1966 New South Wales Paraplegic Championships he won 11 titles in events in athletics, fencing and swimming and also competed in table tennis and snooker. At the 1968 Australian Paraplegic Games he won 14 medals, including 10 gold medals, in athletics, fencing, swimming and weightlifting.

At the 1960 Rome Paralympics, Hooper won a silver medal in the Men's Precision Javelin B event. At the 1964 Tokyo Paralympics, he won a gold medal in the Men's Wheelchair Dash above T10 event and two silver medals in the Men's Wheelchair Relay above T10 and Men's Lightweight weightlifting events; he also competed in swimming and wheelchair fencing at the Games. At the 1968 Tel Aviv Paralympics, he won a gold medal in the Men's 100m Wheelchair A event and two silver medals in the Men's 4x40m Relay open and Men's Shot Put B events; he also competed in swimming, weightlifting, and wheelchair fencing at the Games. 

He participated in the 1962, 1966, and 1970 Commonwealth Paraplegic Games in Perth, Jamaica, and Edinburgh, respectively. At the 1962 Commonwealth Paraplegic Games Hooper won 5 gold medals in javelin, precision javelin, club throw shot put and wheelchair basketball, 2 silver medals in breaststroke and weightlifting and 2 bronze medals in the 'Australian crawl' and backstroke swimming events. At the 1966 Commonwealth Paraplegic Games Hooper contested 16 events in total across 5 sports and won 12 medals: gold medals for javelin, club throw, relay, shot put, backstroke; silver in wheelchair sprint, discus sabre teams, basketball and weightlifting; bronze in foils and sabre individual events. At the 1970 Commonwealth Paraplegic Games  Hooper won 6 medals in athletics and weightlifting: gold in the precision javelin and 4X100m relay, silver in the 100m, shot put and slalom and bronze in weightlifting.

Hooper retired from competitive sport in 1976 after suffering injuries in a car accident.

He took up lawn bowls in 1988 and aimed for selection as a lawn bowler at the 1992 Barcelona Paralympics. However, after being on the Paralympic program since 1968, lawn bowls was not included in 1992.

Hooper was a judge in fencing at the 2000 Sydney Olympics.

Recognition
Hooper became a Member of the Order of the British Empire in 1969 "for achievements at the Paraplegic Games and services to disabled persons".

Hooper carried the Olympic and Paralympic Torches during the respective torch relays for the Sydney 2000 Olympic and Paralympic Games.

Hooper was inducted into the Hunter Region Sporting Hall of Fame in 2001.

References

Paralympic athletes of Australia
Male Paralympic swimmers of Australia
Paralympic weightlifters of Australia
Paralympic wheelchair fencers of Australia
Australian male fencers
Athletes (track and field) at the 1960 Summer Paralympics
Athletes (track and field) at the 1964 Summer Paralympics
Athletes (track and field) at the 1968 Summer Paralympics
Swimmers at the 1964 Summer Paralympics
Swimmers at the 1968 Summer Paralympics
Weightlifters at the 1964 Summer Paralympics
Weightlifters at the 1968 Summer Paralympics
Wheelchair fencers at the 1964 Summer Paralympics
Wheelchair fencers at the 1968 Summer Paralympics
Medalists at the 1960 Summer Paralympics
Medalists at the 1964 Summer Paralympics
Medalists at the 1968 Summer Paralympics
Paralympic gold medalists for Australia
Paralympic silver medalists for Australia
Paralympic medalists in athletics (track and field)
Paralympic medalists in weightlifting
Wheelchair category Paralympic competitors
Australian male swimmers
Paralympic wheelchair racers
Members of the Order of the British Empire
Athletes from Sydney
People with polio
People with paraplegia
20th-century Australian people
1939 births
Living people